KOI-81 is an eclipsing binary star in the constellation of Cygnus. It lies in the field of view of the Kepler Mission and was determined to have an object in orbit around it which is smaller and hotter than the main star.

KOI-81b
KOI-81b is a hot compact object orbiting KOI-81. The orbit of KOI-81b around the main star takes 23.8776 days to complete. Analysis of relativistic effects in the Kepler light curve suggests that it is a low-mass white dwarf of approximately 0.3 solar masses, produced by a previous stage of mass transfer during the object's giant phase.

See also
 KOI-74, a similar system also discovered by the Kepler Mission.
Kepler Object of Interest, stars observed to have transits by the Kepler Mission

References

B-type main-sequence stars
Cygnus (constellation)
Eclipsing binaries
White dwarfs
81